Joaquín Fernández de Piérola Marín is a Spanish businessman and the CEO of Abengoa. He holds degrees from the University of Zaragoza, University of West England, and the IESE Business School. He previously worked in the Spanish embassies located in Riyadh and Baghdad, as well as for Befesa.

References

Spanish businesspeople
Living people
Year of birth missing (living people)
Directors of Abengoa
Place of birth missing (living people)
University of Zaragoza alumni